One Hysterical Night is a 1929 American pre-Code comedy film directed by William James Craft and starring Reginald Denny, Nora Lane, Walter Brennan and Peter Gawthorne.

Plot summary
A wealthy man dresses up as Napoleon for a fancy dress ball, but is instead detained in a lunatic asylum where they suspect him of having delusions of grandeur.

Cast
 Reginald Denny as William 'Napoleon' Judd
 Nora Lane as Nurse Josephine
 E. J. Ratcliffe as Wellington
 Fritz Feld as Paganini
 Slim Summerville as Robin Hood
 Joyzelle Joyner as Salome
 Jules Cowles as William Tell
 Walter Brennan as Paul Revere
 Henry Otto as Doctor Hayden
 Margaret Campbell as Mrs Bixby
 Peter Gawthorne as Mr Bixby
 Rolfe Sedan as Arthur Bixby

References

External links

1929 films
1929 comedy films
1920s English-language films
Films directed by William James Craft
Silent American comedy films
Universal Pictures films
American black-and-white films
Cultural depictions of Napoleon
1920s American films